The Pentro Horse is a breed of horse originating in the area of Isernia, in the Molise region of Italy. It is one of the fifteen indigenous horse "breeds of limited distribution" recognised by the AIA, the Italian breeders' association. It takes its name from the ancient Samnite tribe of the Pentri. Like many Italian breeds the Pentro is raised on open land year-round, where it has to fend off wolves, which have returned to the Italian countryside in considerable numbers.

The Pentro horse is threatened with extinction. The total population is about 250, of which no more than 150 display the morphological characteristics of the breed. The surviving members live in the Pantano della Zittola, a broad plain extending over about 2200 hectares, lying on the edge of the Abruzzo National Park in the mountainous region between Abruzzo and Molise. There is no established conservation program in the area and the horses there are raised as feral animals viewed as characteristic fauna of the land.

References

External links
 Documentary on Pentro Horse
 More on the Pentro Horse

Horse breeds
Horse breeds originating in Italy